Boneh-ye Akhund may refer to:
 Boneh-ye Akhund, Khuzestan
 Boneh-ye Akhund, Kohgiluyeh and Boyer-Ahmad